Botaurus is a genus of bitterns, a group of wading bird in the heron family Ardeidae. The genus name Botaurus was given by the English naturalist James Francis Stephens, and is derived from Medieval Latin butaurus, "bittern", itself constructed from the Middle English name for the Eurasian Bittern, Botor. Pliny gave a fanciful derivation from Bos (ox) and taurus (bull), because the bittern's call resembles the bellowing of a bull.

The genus has a single representative species in each of North, Central and South America, Eurasia, and Australasia. The two northern species are partially migratory, with many birds moving south to warmer areas in winter.

The four Botaurus bitterns are all large chunky, heavily streaked brown birds which breed in large reed beds. Almost uniquely for predatory birds, the female rears the young alone. They are secretive and well-camouflaged, and despite their size they can be difficult to observe except for occasional flight views.

Like other bitterns, they eat fish, frogs, and similar aquatic life.

Species

Extinct species
 Botaurus hibbardi

References

 

Bird genera